Eilema tomponis is a moth of the subfamily Arctiinae. It is found in Taiwan.

References

 Natural History Museum Lepidoptera generic names catalog

tomponis
Moths of Taiwan